Capriccio may refer to:


Music
 Capriccio (music), a piece of music which is fairly free in form
 Fantasia in C major (Haydn), "Capriccio", a 1789 piano composition by Joseph Haydn
 Capriccio (Janáček), a chamber music composition by Leoš Janáček
 Capriccio, a 1929 composition for piano and orchestra by Stravinsky
 Capriccio (opera), a 1942 opera by Richard Strauss
 Capriccio (record label), an Austrian classical music record label

Films
 Capriccio (1938 film), a German historical comedy
 Capriccio (1972 film), by Carmelo Bene
 Capriccio (1987 film), by Tinto Brass

Other uses
 Capriccio (art), in painting an architectural fantasy
 Capriccio (Rex Whistler), a 1936-1938 mural by Rex Whistler at Plas Newydd, Anglesey
 Capriccio, a collection of poems by Ted Hughes published in 1990
 Capriccio (manga volume), a volume of the manga series One Piece released in 2003

See also
 El Capricho, a building in Comillas, designed by Antoni Gaudí